"What If I Stumble?" is a song by the American contemporary Christian music group DC Talk. Released in 1995, it was the third radio single from the group's fourth album, Jesus Freak.

"What If I Stumble?" received many critical plaudits from Christian sources for its deep and introspective lyrics concerning the possibilities that personal weaknesses could bring shame to Christ.

Composition
The song features a vocal quote from Brennan Manning.

"The greatest single cause of atheism in the world today is Christians who acknowledge Jesus with their lips and then walk out the door and deny him by their lifestyle. That is what an unbelieving world simply finds unbelievable."

Release and acclaim
The song was released as the third single for Jesus Freak in 1996 and received positive comments from Christian music critics.

"What If I Stumble?" was No. 1 for six weeks on Christian Radio.

Other releases
Various versions of "What If I Stumble?" have appeared on several DC Talk official releases, including the band's greatest hits album Intermission. A live version of "What If I Stumble?" was included on the 1997 live release Welcome to the Freak Show.

Cover versions

On the DC Talk tribute album, Freaked!, Sarah Kelly recorded a cover of "What If I Stumble?"

Personnel
Toby McKeehan – vocals, production
Michael Tait – vocals
Kevin Max Smith – vocals
John Painter – bass guitar
Chris Rodriquez – guitar
Jerry McPherson – mandolin
John Painter – bass guitar, guitar, accordion
Todd Collins – programming, cowbell, drums
Shawn McWilliams – drums
Todd Collins – percussion
Mark Heimermann – production, vocal arrangement

Accolades

References
Farias, Andree. Encyclopedia of American Gospel Music. Routledge, 2005. 
Taff, Tori. 100 Greatest Songs in Christian Music. Integrity, 2006.

Notes

1996 singles
DC Talk songs
Songs written by TobyMac
1995 songs
ForeFront Records singles